In international relations, the liberal international order describes a set of global, rule-based, structured relationships based on political liberalism, economic liberalism and liberal internationalism since the late 1940s. More specifically, it entails international cooperation through multilateral institutions (like the United Nations, World Trade Organization and International Monetary Fund) and is constituted by human equality (freedom, rule of law and human rights), open markets, security cooperation, promotion of liberal democracy, and monetary cooperation. The order was established in the aftermath of World War II, led in large part by the United States.

The nature of the liberal international order (LIO), as well as its very existence, has been debated by scholars. The LIO has been credited with expanding free trade, increasing capital mobility, spreading democracy, promoting human rights, and collectively defending the West from the Soviet Union. The LIO facilitated unprecedented cooperation among the states of North America, Western Europe and Japan. Over time, the LIO facilitated the spread of economic liberalism to the rest of the world, as well as helped consolidate democracy in formerly fascist or communist countries.

Origins of the LIO have commonly been identified as the 1940s, usually starting in 1945, with some scholars pointing to earlier agreements between the WWII-era Allies such as the Atlantic Charter in 1941. John Mearsheimer has dissented with this view, arguing that the LIO only arose after the end of the Cold War. Core founding members of the LIO include the states of North America, Western Europe and Japan; these states form a security community. The characteristics of the LIO have varied over time. Some scholars refer to a Cold War variation of the LIO largely limited to the West, and a post-Cold War variation having a more widespread scope and giving international institutions more powers.

Aspects of the LIO are challenged internally within liberal states by populism, protectionism and nativism. Scholars have argued that embedded liberalism (or the logics inherent in the Double Movement) are key to maintaining public support for the planks of the LIO; some scholars have raised questions whether aspects of embedded liberalism have been undermined, thus leading to a backlash against the LIO.

Externally, the LIO is challenged by authoritarian states, illiberal states, and states that are discontented with their roles in world politics. China, Russia, Iran and North Korea have been characterized as prominent challengers to the LIO. Some scholars have argued that the LIO contains self-undermining aspects that could trigger backlash or collapse.

Definition 

David Lake, Lisa Martin and Thomas Risse define "order" as "patterned or structured relationships among units". Interactions in the LIO are structured by rules, norms and decision-making procedures. They note that the LIO is not synonymous with a "rule-based international order", as non-liberal rule-based orders may exist (such as the Westphalian order).

They define "liberal" as a belief in the universal equality of individuals, as well as individual and collective freedoms. Political liberalism entails the rule of law, and the sovereign equality of states, as well as protections for human rights, political rights and civil liberties. Economic liberalism entails free market-oriented policies. Liberal internationalism entails principled multilateralism and global governance.

Michael Barnett defines an international order as "patterns of relating and acting" derived from and maintained by rules, institutions, law and norms. International orders have both a material and social component. Legitimacy (the generalized perception that actions are desirable, proper or appropriate) is essential to political orders. George Lawson has defined an international order as "regularized practices of exchange among discrete political units that recognize each other to be independent." John Mearsheimer defines an international order as "an organized group of international institutions that help govern the interactions among the member states."

In After Victory (2001), John Ikenberry defines a political order as "the governing arrangements among a group of states, including its fundamental rules, principles and institutions." Political orders are established when the basic organizing arrangements are set up, and they break down when the basic organizing arrangements are overturned, contested or in disarray. He defines a constitutional international order as a political order "organized around agreed-upon legal and political institutions that operate to allocate rights and limit the exercise of power." There are four main core elements of constitutional orders:

 Shared agreement about the rules of the game within the order
 Rules and institutions that bind and limit the exercise of power
 Institutional autonomy from special interests
 The entrenchment of these rules and institutions with a broader, immutable political system.
In 2018, Ikenberry defined the liberal international order as:multilayered, multifaceted, and not simply a political formation imposed by the leading state. International order is not “one thing” that states either join or resist. It is an aggregation of various sorts of ordering rules and institutions. There are the deep rules and norms of sovereignty... There is a sprawling array of international institutions, regimes, treaties, agreements, protocols, and so forth. These governing arrangements cut across diverse realms, including security and arms control, the world economy, the environment and global commons, human rights, and political relations. Some of these domains of governance may have rules and institutions that narrowly reflect the interests of the hegemonic state, but most reflect negotiated outcomes based on a much broader set of interests. Charles Glaser has disputed the analytical value of the concept of the LIO, arguing that the concept is so broad and vague that "almost any international situation qualifies as an international order, so long as its members accept the sovereignty norm." Some critics of the LIO, such as John Mearsheimer, have argued that liberal democracy promotion and hyper-globalization are elements of the LIO.

Jeff Colgan has characterized the liberal international order as the theme that unites multiple subsystems in the international system. These subsystems can experience drastic change without fundamentally changing the liberal international order.

Debates 
The debate about liberal international order has grown especially prominent in International Relations. Daniel Deudney and John Ikenberry list five components of this international order: security co-binding, in which great powers demonstrate restraint; the open nature of US hegemony and the dominance of reciprocal transnational relations; the presence of self-limiting powers like Germany and Japan; the availability of mutual gains due to "the political foundations of economic openness"; and the role of Western "civil identity." According to Charles Glaser, there are five key mechanisms in the LIO: "democracy, hierarchy built on legitimate authority, institutional binding, economic interdependence, and political convergence."

The more supportive views of scholars such as Ikenberry have drawn criticism from scholars who have examined the imperial and colonial legacies of liberal international institutions. The contributions of non-Western actors to the formation of the liberal international order have also recently gained attention from scholars advancing global International Relations theory. In the case of Latin America, for example, "From as far back as the 1860s, Latin American jurists have made prominent contributions to international jurisprudence, the ‘mortar’ that binds international order. [...] However, in other ways, historically the LIO has been—and remains—superficial in its reach in Latin America." According to Abrahamsen, Andersen, and Sending, the contemporary liberal international order includes the legacy of "southern actors" in Africa and Asia advocating the process of decolonization.

International organizations play a central role in the liberal order. The World Trade Organization, for example, creates and implements free trade agreements, while the World Bank provides aid to developing countries. The order is also premised on the notion that liberal trade and free markets will contribute to global prosperity and peace. Critics argue that free trade has sometimes led to social problems such as inequality and environmental degradation.

Post-Cold War, some consider international agreements on issues such as climate change, nuclear nonproliferation, and upholding initiatives in maritime law (UNCLOS) to constitute elements of the LIO.  The European Union is often considered a major example of the liberal international order put into effect in terms of international agreements between the constituent countries, while the supranational union has been considered a power in its own right that can uphold the liberal international order. This has led to debates about how the European Union's identity will continue forming in the future, as multilateralism is a core part.

Critics also argue that the liberal order tilts the scales in favour of the United States and its Western allies, as seen in voting shares in the International Monetary Fund and World Bank.

Others argue that weak states played a central role in shaping the liberal international order. Marcos Tourinho argues that weak states used the three strategies of "resistance", "community" and "norms" to push back on U.S. dominance during the construction of the liberal international order, thus ensuring that the order did not just reflect U.S. interests. Martha Finnemore argues that unipolarity does not just entail a material superiority by the unipole, but also a social structure whereby the unipole maintains its status through legitimation, and institutionalization. In trying to obtain legitimacy from the other actors in the international system, the unipole necessarily gives those actors a degree of power. The unipole also obtains legitimacy and wards off challenges to its power through the creation of institutions, but these institutions also entail a diffusion of power away from the unipole. David Lake has argued along similar lines that legitimacy and authority are key components of international order. Abrahamsen suggested that middle powers also benefit from liberal internationalism. By investing in the maintenance of multilateral institutions, moderate powers can collectively advocate for their self-interest, counterbalancing great power politics. Supporting liberal internationalism is thus a form of realpolitik for middle powers.

Realist critics of the LIO include John  Mearsheimer, Patrick Porter and Charles Glaser. Mearsheimer has argued that the LIO is bound to fail due to the pushback it faces internally within liberal states and externally by non-liberal states. Porter has argued that the LIO was actually a coercive order and that it was not liberal. Glaser has argued that the balance of power theory, bargaining theory and neo-institutional theories better explain NATO than mechanisms associated with the LIO.

Aaron McKeil finds realist criticism of liberal order insufficient. He argues that the alternative foreign policies offered by realists as "restraint" and "offshore balancing" would be more generative of proxy wars and would fail to offer the level of institutions required for managing great power competition and international challenges.

Relations with individual countries 
According to political scientist Charles A. Ziegler, both China and Russia "reject the political dimension of the liberal international order that favors human rights, humanitarian intervention, and democracy promotion." According to Paul Stronski and Nicole Ng of the Carnegie Endowment for International Peace, "the greatest threat to the West of the Sino-Russian partnership emanates from their efforts to adjust the international system to their advantage". Additionally, "Moscow, particularly since 2014, has mounted a revisionist and offensive challenge to the current order, showing a willingness to take substantial risks to weaken Western power within the international system. In contrast to Russia, China recognizes that it has benefited from the liberal international order. The processes of economic liberalism and globalization have facilitated its rapid economic rise over the past thirty years."

China 
Some see China as a potential challenger to the liberal order. According to Darrren Lim and John Ikenberry, China seeks an international order that protects its illiberal domestic political and economic model. Scholars cite initiatives such as the Asian Infrastructure Investment Bank and One Belt One Road Initiative as institutions that appear to compete with existing liberal international institutions. Van Niewenhuizen is categorical that Xi Jinping, then General Secretary of the Chinese Communist Party, seeks to supplant the LIO. According to political scientist Thomas Ambrosio, one aim of the Shanghai Cooperation Organisation was to ensure that liberal democracy could not gain ground in these countries, promoting authoritarian norms in Central Asia.

Rühlig asks in his March 2018 paper why China under Xi would seek to change a system by which it earns enormous profit, World Economic Forum fellow Anoushiravan Ehteshami says, "China sees Iran as its Western gateway, where not only is it a big market in itself, but it will also be the gateway to the rest of the Middle East and ultimately to Europe for China." Nisha Mary Mathew remarks that the quest for dominance of the Eurasian land mass in which China finds itself causes Iran to be a favourite. In 2017 alone, the Chinese signed deals for Iranian infrastructure projects worth more than US$15 billion. Joint projects include "high-speed rail lines, upgrades to the nation’s electrical grid, and natural gas pipelines". From 2019 to 2025, the two nations seek to increase bilateral trade to US$600 billion.

Russia 
Many scholars agree that the Russian Federation under Vladimir Putin seeks to undermine the liberal international order. Various viewpoints have been developed on the subject. The first is that Russia is a "revanchist power" seeking to completely overturn international diplomacy, the second is that Russia is a "defensive power" that seeks to push incremental change in the existing order, and the third is that Russia is an "aggressive isolationist", with Putin playing a "spoiler role" in international affairs to boost legitimacy domestically.

Political sociologist Larry Diamond argues that Putin's assault on liberal democracy is exemplified by the 2008 military intervention for the enclaves of Abkhazia and South Ossetia against independent Georgia, Russian support for Viktor Yanukovych in Ukraine, and the Russian military intervention in Ukraine by troops without insignia in 2014. Putin has been accused of giving financial support to far-right or national populist parties across Europe. For example, the National Front (now National Rally) obtained a 9 million euro loan from a Russian bank in 2014. Larry Diamond argues this influenced the policy of the National Front such as Marine Le Pen's support for the annexation of Crimea.

The 2022 Russian invasion of Ukraine and a widespread response against the invasion has led to renewed discussion of the liberal international order. Political scientist Lucan Way writes that Putin's invasion has inadvertently strengthened the liberal international order in opposition, with the full-scale Russian invasion being a more conspicuously imperialistic challenge to sovereignty than smaller-scale frozen conflicts and political interferences. Way says that blocs such as the European Union will have more unified action while being currently pillars in the liberal international order. Samir Saran, head of the Delhi-based Observer Research Foundation, says that a renewed emphasis in the liberal international order offers new opportunities for the international community, but hopes that the LIO should maintain interest in global issues after the security crisis in Europe. Edward Luce says the invasion is a serious threat to the international order because, "should Putin succeed, it would legitimise the law of the jungle, where large countries can annex smaller ones with impunity." At the same time, Luce suggests different terminology should be used besides "liberal international order" due to what he says is the selective nature of diplomacy. Kori Schake argues that the Russian invasion has provoked a Western response which strengthens the transatlantic alliance, a main component of the LIO, yet has also involved a global response, with the largest partner being Japan. Schake suggests that Ukraine's own defense is a new strengthening element to the LIO, by showing a stark contrast between liberalism and authoritarianism.

See also 
Cosmopolitan democracy
European Union
European integration
Global citizenship
Hegemony
Institutional liberalism
Liberal democratic basic order
Liberal internationalism
Liberalism (international relations)
Multilateralism
New International Economic Order
Perpetual peace
Polarity
Spheres of influence
Western culture

Further reading 

A World Imagined: Nostalgia and Liberal Order By Patrick Porter
There's No Such Thing as 'the' Liberal World Order by Michael Lind
Asia after the liberal international order by Amitav Acharya
Misreading the “Liberal Order” by Paul Staniland
Paeans to the ‘Postwar Order’ Won’t Save Us by Stephen Wertheim
Robert Keohane. 1984. After Hegemony: Cooperation and Discord in the World Political Economy. Princeton University Press.
 John Ikenberry. 2001. After Victory: Institutions, Strategic Restraint, and the Rebuilding of Order after Major Wars. Princeton University Press.
Latin America and the liberal international order by Tom Long
Ordering the world? Liberal internationalism in theory and practice, edited by G. John Ikenberry, Inderjeet Parmar, Doug Stokes
Kyle M. Lascurettes and Michael Poznansky. 2021. "International Order in Theory and Practice." in the Oxford Research Encyclopedia of International Studies.

References

External links
Bound to Fail: The Rise and Fall of the Liberal International Order by John J. Mearsheimer
Will Current World Order Survive Without US Power? by Rajesh Rajagopalan
How do you solve a problem like the liberal international order? by Jeet Heer
The Amnesia of the U.S. Foreign Policy Establishment by John Glaser
Mourning a phantom: the cherished “rules-based order” never existed by Helen Thompson
 The ‘Liberal World Order’ Was Built With Blood by Vincent Bevins

International relations
Liberalism
Multilateral relations
International security
International relations terminology
International relations theory
Democracy promotion
Western culture